The 1986 FIBA Europe Under-18 Championship was an international basketball  competition held in Austria in 1986.

Final standings

1. 

2. 

3. 

4. 

5. 

6. 

7. 

8. 

9. 

10. 

11. 

12.

Awards

External links
FIBA Archive

FIBA U18 European Championship
1986–87 in European basketball
1986 in Austrian sport
International youth basketball competitions hosted by Austria